The Birbhum is a large coal field located in the east of India in West Bengal. Birbhum is having estimated reserves of 5 billion tonnes of coal.

Deucha Pachami coal block spread over an area of 9.7 km2 is to be developed by Bengal Birbhum Coal Company Limited. Another potential coal reserve is Dewanganj Harinsingha block with an estimated area of 2.6 km2. These blocks are located in Mohammad Bazar CD Block.

References 

Coalfields of India
Coal mining in West Bengal